HMS Haughty was a  which served with the Royal Navy.  She was launched by William Doxford & Sons on 18 September 1895, served in home waters, and was sold on 10 April 1912.

Construction and design
HMS Haughty was one of the two destroyers ordered from William Doxford & Sons on 3 November 1893 as part of the Royal Navy's 1893–1894 construction programme.

As a torpedo boat, the planned armament was a single QF 12 pounder 12 cwt ( calibre) gun on a platform on the ship's conning tower (in practice the platform was also used as the ship's bridge), together with a secondary gun armament of three 6-pounder guns, and two 18 inch (450 mm) torpedo tubes. As a gunboat, one of the torpedo tubes could be removed to accommodate a further two six-pounders.

Three funnels were fitted. The ship's complement was 50 officers and men.

She was laid down as Yard Number 227 at Doxford's Sunderland shipyard on 28 May 1894, and was launched on 18 September 1895, with Miss Greta Doxford, daughter of William Theodore Doxford, serving as a sponsor.

Service history
In 1896 Haughty was in reserve at Chatham. Later she was commissioned in the Medway Instructional Flotilla. In January 1900, under the command of Lieutenant and Commander E. Leatham, she had a breakdown in her machinery, and was paid off at Chatham to have defects made good and undergo a refit. In May 1902 she received the officers and men from the destroyer , and was commissioned on 8 May at Chatham by Lieutenant Harry Charles John Roberts West for service with the Medway Instructional Flotilla. She took part in the fleet review held at Spithead on 16 August 1902 for the coronation of King Edward VII, and Lieutenant William Boyle was appointed in command later the same month, on 28 August. She did not rejoin the Medway flotilla until the middle of October.

On 2 July 1908 Haughty was taking part in the annual Naval Manoeuvres when she collided with the destroyer . While Haughtys bow was only slightly twisted, the damage to Ranger was more severe, with her hull holed.

In 1910 Haughty was a member of the Sixth Destroyer Flotilla as a tender to the shore establishment .

Haughty was sold for scrap on 10 April 1912.

Citations

References
 

 
 

Hardy-class destroyers
Ships built on the River Wear
1895 ships
A-class destroyers (1913)